Thony may be a surname, given name or a nickname. As a given name or nickname, it is considered to be a creative spelling of Tony used as a male name in Sweden and Denmark (and to a lesser extent Norway and Finland) and on occasion as a female name in Denmark. The name is in use in the United States. As a surname, it is commonly spelled Thöny.

Given name
Thony Andenas (born 1974), French football player
Thony Belizaire (1955 – 2013), Haitian photographer
Thony De La Rosa, fictional protagonist of The Cleaning Lady

Nickname
Thony (born 1982; Federica Victoria Johanna Caiozzo), Italian singer and actress
Thony Halili (1946 – 2018), nickname for Antonio Halili, Filipino politician
Thony Hemery (born 1972), nickname for Anthony Hemery, French freestyle skier

Surname
Eduard Thöny (1866 - 1950), German artist
Serge Thony, birthname of D'Chrome Foster (born 1977), American singer and actor.
Wilhelm Thöny (1888 - 1949) Austrian artist

See also

Anthony
Thon (name)
Thone (disambiguation)
Thong (surname)
Thory (disambiguation)
Tony (given name)

Notes

Danish masculine given names
Swedish masculine given names